State Road 480 (NM 480) is a  state highway in the US state of New Mexico. NM 480's western terminus is at NM 330 north of Elida, and the eastern terminus is at U.S. Route 70 (US 70) southwest of Portales.

Major intersections

See also

References

480
Transportation in Roosevelt County, New Mexico